Robert Evans (1889 New York City, New York – Unknown) was an American racecar driver. He drove in the 1911 Indianapolis 500 as a relief driver for Jack Tower, then made a Championship Car race start on the Santa Monica Road Race Course in 1912, finishing second. He then drove in the 1913 Indianapolis 500 which would be his final Champ Car race.

Indy 500 results

External links
Robert Evans at ChampCarStats.com

1889 births
Year of death missing
Indianapolis 500 drivers
Racing drivers from New York City